Jiang Benhu (born 1964), better known by his pen name Mai Jia, is a Chinese novelist. He also served as the president of Zhejiang Writers Association and vice president of the Zhejiang Literature and Art Association.

Biography
Jiang was born in Fuyang District, Hangzhou, Zhejiang Province in 1964. He was drafted into the People's Liberation Army and served for 17 years.

Jiang graduated from People's Liberation Army Foreign Language College in 1983, where he majored in wireless radio. He started to publish works in 1986. Jiang was accepted to People's Liberation Army Arts College in 1987 and graduated in 1991, majoring in literature.

In 1997, Jiang worked in Chengdu Satellite TV as an editor. In 2008, Jiang was transferred from Chengdu to Hangzhou.

In December 2010, Jiang was elected the vice president of the Zhejiang Literature and Art Association. On July 1, 2013, Jiang was elected the president of Zhejiang Writers Association.

Works

Novellas
 Letting the Masked Man Speak

Novels
 Decoded (2002)
 In the Dark (2003)
 Sound of the Wind (2007)

Translated works
 Decoded, trans. Olivia Milburn and Christopher Payne (London: Allan Lane, 2014)
 In the Dark, trans. Olivia Milburn and Christopher Payne (London: Penguin, 2015)
 The Message, trans. Olivia Milburn (London: Head of Zeus, 2020)

Awards
 Decoded - 6th National Book Award
 In the Dark - 7th Mao Dun Literature Prize

References

1964 births
Writers from Hangzhou
People's Liberation Army Arts College alumni
Living people
Mao Dun Literature Prize laureates
Chinese male novelists
People's Republic of China novelists